Futamata Station is the name of two train stations in Japan:

 Futamata Station (Hokkaidō) (二股駅)
 Futamata Station (Kyoto) (二俣駅)